Flotillin-1 is a protein that in humans is encoded by the FLOT1 gene.

Caveolae are small domains on the inner cell membrane involved in vesicular trafficking and signal transduction.  FLOT1 encodes a caveolae-associated, integral membrane protein.  The function of flotillin 1 has not been determined.

Interactions 

FLOT1 has been shown to interact with SORBS1.

References

Further reading

External links